Bernd Anders (born 30 September 1942) is a German boxer. He competed in the men's heavyweight event at the 1968 Summer Olympics.

References

1942 births
Living people
German male boxers
Olympic boxers of East Germany
Boxers at the 1968 Summer Olympics
Boxers from Berlin
People from East Berlin
Heavyweight boxers